The Moving True Story of a Woman Ahead of Her Time (West Frisian title: Nynke) is a 2001 Dutch drama film in the West Frisian language. It is a costume drama film about the life of Nienke van Hichtum and Dutch socialist and politician Pieter Jelles Troelstra. It is written and directed by Pieter Verhoeff. 

The film received a Golden Film (75,000 visitors) and Platinum Film in 2001. It also won two Golden Calves.

Plot
The film follows the life of Nynke from the time she first met Troelstra until their divorce.

Cast
 Monic Hendrickx as Nienke van Hichtum
 Jeroen Willems as Pieter Jelles Troelstra
 Peter Tuinman as Father of Pieter Jelles
 Rients Gratama as Father of Nienke
 Carine Crutzen as Cornélie Huygens

External links

References 

2001 films
2001 drama films
Frisian-language films
Films directed by Pieter Verhoeff
Films shot in the Netherlands
Dutch drama films
2000s Dutch-language films